This is a list of the National Register of Historic Places listings in Kimble County, Texas.

This is intended to be a complete list of properties listed on the National Register of Historic Places in Kimble County, Texas. There are 4 properties listed on the National Register in the county. Two properties are also a Recorded Texas Historic Landmark.

Current listings

The locations of National Register properties may be seen in a mapping service provided.

|}

See also

National Register of Historic Places listings in Texas
Recorded Texas Historic Landmarks in Kimble County

References

External links

Kimble County, Texas
Kimble County
Buildings and structures in Kimble County, Texas